The James Greer McQuilkin Round Barn is a historic building located near Eagle Center in rural Benton County, Iowa, United States. It was built in 1918 for James Greer McQuilkin.  He farmed and sold barns that were designed by Johnston Brothers' Clay Works. The building is a true round barn that measures  in diameter. The barn is constructed of clay tile and features a hay dormer on the north side. The structure does not have a cupola, but has a silo that rises from the center. A new metal roof was added in 1998. It has been listed on the National Register of Historic Places since 1986.

References

Infrastructure completed in 1918
Buildings and structures in Benton County, Iowa
Barns on the National Register of Historic Places in Iowa
Round barns in Iowa
National Register of Historic Places in Benton County, Iowa